Jackson House State Park Heritage Site is a  Washington state park centered around the John R. Jackson House, the restored homestead cabin of John R. and Matilda Jackson, who were among the first Euro-American settlers north of the Columbia River.  After moving to the Oregon Territory in 1844 and marrying Matilda (previously named Matilda Nettle Glover Coontz) in 1848, John built the house for his family in 1850.  The home fell into disrepair until the Jacksons' granddaughter Anna Koontz led restoration efforts by the St. Helens Club of Chehalis, a women's literacy and civic group.  The then-current owner donated the cabin site and a small surrounding parcel to the state for park use, and the restoration proceeded in 1915.

The Washington State Board of Park Commissioners accepted the Jackson House as one of Washington's first two state parks at the first meeting of the Commission on November 22, 1915.  The park was added to the National Register of Historic Places in 1974.

References

External links
Jackson House State Park Heritage Site, Washington State Parks and Recreation Commission

State parks of Washington (state)
Parks in Lewis County, Washington